Cosenza Calcio 1914 was a professional Italian football club based in Cosenza, Calabria.

It starts in 1912 when was founded Società Sportiva Fortitudo (the year 1914 is a reference to the first historic match played by the club on 23 February 1914). The club was expelled from the professional leagues in 2003, only readmitted a year later in Serie D. In 2005 the club folded, ended its 91 years of history.

From 2003 to 2007 A.S. Cosenza Calcio claimed as the successor, which was relocated from nearby town. Again 2007, Fortitudo Cosenza was relocated from Rende as the new successor, and renamed to Cosenza Calcio 1914 Srl in 2008. However, the spiritual successor folded again in 2011, which yet another new club Nuova Cosenza Calcio was refound using Article 52 of N.O.I.F. in 2011–12 Serie D.

From 1912 to 2005

Cosenza Calcio 1914 SpA

Early times and Serie B

The club was founded on 18 November 1912 as Società Sportiva Fortitudo  (the year 1914 is a reference to the first historic match played by the club on 23 February 1914) and enjoyed a long time in the professional leagues, spending several years in the Serie B and launching several famous players. They also won the Anglo-Italian Cup in 1983. During the 1980s and the 1990s, the Calabrian side barely missed promotion to the Italian top flight several times, most notably in 1989, when they ended with the same points than fourth-placed Cremonese and Reggina, but being not admitted to the promotion playoff as having the worst results of the three in head-to-head matches. In 1991–92, Cosenza lost promotion again, with a final fifth place only two points behind of Udinese.

Serie D times
Following these highs, the club successively started experiencing hard times, being ultimately excluded in July 2003 by the federation due to financial issues, leaving Cosenza suddenly without a club.

In 2004, it franchise was however admitted back into Serie D following a judicial sentence, together the new A.S. Cosenza F.C.: this caused the city of Cosenza to have two different "rival" clubs into the same division. This lasted only one year, as Cosenza 1914 finally folded.

Notable former players
International footballers of Cosenza Calcio 1914
  Stefano Fiore
  Gianluigi Lentini
  Cristiano Lucarelli
  Christian Manfredini
  Mark Edusei
  Marius Stankevičius
  Rubén Maldonado
  Massimo Margiotta

Colors and badge
The team's official colours were red and blue.

Honours
Anglo-Italian Cup: 1 (1983)
Serie C: 1 (1960–61)
Serie C1: 2 (1987–88), (1997–98)
Serie C2: 1 (1979–80)
Serie D: 2 (1957–58,  1974–75)

Shirt sponsors and manufacturers

Spiritual Successors

A.S. Cosenza Calcio (2003–07)

Castrovillari was relocated to Cosenza in 2003. The club spent 4 seasons in Serie D.

Fortitudo Cosenza (2007–11)

In 2007 A.S. Cosenza Calcio gave up its Serie D membership, but all the team players later joined new club "Fortitudo Cosenza", which is relocated from Rende.

Following this, the new club renamed itself, taking the old historical denomination of "Cosenza Calcio 1914 S.r.l." with the aim to rise up the Italian football pyramid. In 2011 the team was then excluded from professional championship by Co.Vi.So.C. of Italian Football Federation and it didn't appeal. Another phoenix club was started in Serie D, as Nuova Cosenza Calcio.

Nuova Cosenza Calcio

In summer 2011 a new club was founded as Nuova Cosenza Calcio and restarted from Serie D It wins promotion playoffs, but it is not automatically promoted.

Footnotes

References

Football clubs in Calabria
Cosenza Calcio
1914 establishments in Italy
2005 disestablishments in Italy